Acanthochitona bednalli, the Bednall's chiton, is a species of chiton in the family Acanthochitonidae.

Description
This species has a broad girdle surrounding the valves.

Distribution
This species is endemic to southeastern and southwestern Australia. These chitons live subtidally on rocks.

References

External links
 Bluering

Acanthochitonidae
Molluscs described in 1894